The Eldorado Success has been the local newspaper for Eldorado, Texas since 1901.

External links
The Eldorado Success  – Official website

Schleicher County, Texas
Newspapers published in Texas